Andrew Garner (born 8 March 1966) is an English former professional footballer who played in the Football League for Derby County and Blackpool. He is a first-team coach at Mansfield Town.

Playing career
Born in Stonebroom, Derbyshire, Garner began his career as an apprentice with Derby County in 1983. He scored some vital goals in the Rams' Division Three promotion season of 1985–86.

In August 1988, Garner joined Sam Ellis's Blackpool for £75,000. He made his debut on opening day, 27 August, in a 1–1 draw at Chester City. Jimmy Mullen took over the manager's seat for 1989–90 and moved Garner into a central-midfield position, where he went on to enjoy more success in a partnership with Paul Groves, although he couldn't help the Seasiders avoid relegation to the Football League's basement division.

Under Billy Ayre, and after Blackpool's failure in the Fourth Division playoff final of 1990–91, Garner was the subject of intense transfer speculation, and it seemed almost certain that he would leave for pastures new. However, the proposed move fell through and he remained at the club for another season, which saw another Wembley playoff final, this time ending in success for Blackpool.

Garner managed to make only seven appearances during the 1992–93 season before joining Gresley Rovers.

Blackpool F.C. Hall of Fame
Garner was inducted into the Hall of Fame at Bloomfield Road, when it was officially opened by former Blackpool player Jimmy Armfield in April 2006. Organised by the Blackpool Supporters Association, Blackpool fans around the world voted on their all-time heroes. Five players from each decade are inducted; Garner is in the 1980s.

Post-retirement
Garner is now a football coach. He has been the first-team coach at his first club, Derby County.

In 2013 Garner followed Nigel Clough to Sheffield United.

After mixed results at Sheffield United, Garner followed Nigel Clough and returned to previous club Burton Albion in 2015 in a coaching role. Subsequently, Burton Albion have achieved promotion to the Championship for the first time in their history.

Honours
Derby County
 Football League Third Division promotion: 1985–86
 Football League Second Division champions: 1986–87
Blackpool
 Football League Fourth Division play-off winner: 1991–92
Gresley Rovers
 Southern Football League Premier Division champions: 1996–97

References

Further reading

External links
Garner at the Blackpool Supporters Association Hall of Fame

"Andy living dream with full-time Rams role" – ThisisDerby.co.uk

1966 births
Living people
People from Stonebroom
Footballers from Derbyshire
English footballers
Derby County F.C. players
Blackpool F.C. players
Gresley F.C. players
Burton Albion F.C. players
English Football League players
Southern Football League players
Burton Albion F.C. non-playing staff
Derby County F.C. non-playing staff
Sheffield United F.C. non-playing staff
Mansfield Town F.C. non-playing staff
Association football forwards
Association football midfielders